Gallup Korea's Film Actor of the Year and Gallup Korea's Television Actor of the Year are annually selected through a year-end public survey conducted across South Korea by Gallup Korea. It was first conducted in 2005 and only respondents above the age of 13 are interviewed.

List of recipients

2010s

2020s

Gallery

See also
 Gallup Korea's Singer of the Year
 Gallup Korea's Song of the Year

References

External links
Gallup Korea

Opinion polling in South Korea
Lists of celebrities